Itoua is a Congolese surname that may refer to:

Béranger Itoua (born 1992), Congolese footballer
Bernard Onanga Itoua (born 1988), French footballer of Congolese descent
Bruno Itoua (born 1956), Congolese politician
Hervé Itoua (born 1942), former bishop of the Roman Catholic Diocese of Ouesso
Rock Itoua-Ndinga (born 1983), Congolese footballer
Teddy Okobo Itoua (born 1979), basketball player from the Republic of the Congo

Surnames of Congolese origin
Kongo-language surnames